The Republic Bashkort Boarding School (RBBS) is an educational institution for gifted students aged 12–16, located in Ufa, Bashkortostan, Russia.

History
The school was founded in 1992 as Republic Bashkort-Turkish Lycee. The school very soon became extremely popular and many talented students were enrolled after passing admission tests on mathematics, IQ, Russian and Bashkort language. First graduation took place in 1996 in the building of Bashkort State Philarmony.

Single-gender education. Only boys are admitted to the school, though at some point three experimental girl classes were formed. They graduated in 2006 and 2007 and experiment was closed, because female department of school was not provided with separate building needed to maintain high-quality education standards, although Local Education Authority has promised to do so before. Nowadays, RBBS continues to be boys only school.

Curriculum
The school implements content and language integrated learning (CLIL) method for delivering curriculum for several main subjects like mathematics, physics, chemistry and computer science. Medium of instruction is English, so by graduation students are fluent in English, Turkish, Russian and Bashkort.

References

External links 
RBBS official site
CLIL approach in RBBS site

Boys' schools in Russia
Education in Bashkortostan
Educational institutions established in 1992
Gifted education
1992 establishments in Russia